HMS E21 was a British E class submarine built by Vickers, Barrow-in-Furness. She was launched on 24 July 1915 and commissioned on 1 October 1915. E21 was sold on 14 December 1921.

Design
She was powered by two  Vickers eight-cylinder two-stroke diesel engines and two  electric motors.

E21 was armed with a 12-pounder QF gun mounted forward of the conning tower. She had five 18 inch (450 mm) torpedo tubes, two in the bow, one either side amidships, and one in the stern; a total of 10 torpedoes were carried.

E-Class submarines had wireless systems with  power ratings; in some submarines, these were later upgraded to  systems by removing a midship torpedo tube. Their maximum design depth was  although in service some reached depths of below . Some submarines contained Fessenden oscillator systems.

Crew
Her complement was three officers and 28 men.

References

Bibliography
 

 

British E-class submarines of the Royal Navy
Ships built in Barrow-in-Furness
1915 ships
World War I submarines of the United Kingdom
Royal Navy ship names